Diyor Mahkamov (sometimes spelled Diyor Makhkamov in English), born 3 November 1987) is an Uzbek pop singer and actor.  The singer was awarded "Badge of Uzbekistan", 30th anniversary of independence of Uzbekistan.

In addition to singing, Diyor also play roles in films. Diyor played his first starring role in the 1999 film "Muhabbat Sinovlari 1".

Biography 
Diyor Mahkamov was born on 3 November 1987 in Tashkent. From 1994 to 2005, he studied at the secondary school in Tashkent. He then in 2005, entered the university and graduated from the Tashkent State University of Economics in 2009. The singer married Nigora Mahkamova in 2006 and today they have 3 children.

Career

Singing career 
Diyor Mahkamov began his singing career in 1998 and continues to this day. Diyor released his first songs in 1998. His song about orphans caused a great deal of controversy. There were rumors that the singer was an orphan. Diyor later said in an interview that the rumors were false. In 2001, the singer released his debut albom "Kutaman". In the same year, he gave a solo concert at the Turkestan Palace of Arts in Tashkent.

In 2003, he released the album "Bolaligim hayr endi" (Goodbye My Childhood). Then he gave his second solo concert in 2003 in the winter hall of  the Turkestan Palace of Arts in Tashkent. After that, there was a break in the singer's career. He studied at the university and got married. But he was photographed in the films this period.

Acting career 
Diyor has portrayed main characters in several Uzbek movies. Muhabbat Sinovlari 1 and Muhabbat Sinovlari 1, in which Diyor played the lead role, did well in box office and Diyor received positive reviews for his role, despite being his debut films. He then starred in several other films, including Yigitlar (Guys) in 2008, Baxt ortidan (After happiness) in 2014, Kunlardan bir kun (One of the days) in 2016, Majnun (Crazy) and Virus (Virus) in 2017.

Discography

Studio albums 
 Kutaman (2001)
 Bolaligim hayr endi (2003)

Music videos

Filmography 
In addition to singing, Diyor Mahkamov also tried his hand at acting and starred in several films. This is a chronologically-ordered list of films in which Diyor has appeared.

Awards 
 Winner "Istiqlol umidlari-2005"
 Winner "Nihol-2006".
 Winner "Barkamol avlod-2008"
 30th anniversary of independence of Uzbekistan

References

External links

Diyor Mahkamov Instagram

Living people
1987 births
21st-century Uzbekistani male singers
Uzbekistani film actors
21st-century Uzbekistani actors
Musicians from Tashkent
Folk-pop singers
Uzbekistani film producers